Brian Harry Harvey, OAM (born 3 October 1965) is an Australian Paralympic athlete.  He was born in the Queensland city of Rockhampton, and has cerebral palsy. At the 1996 Atlanta Games, he won a gold medal in the Men's Javelin F34/37 event, for which he received a Medal of the Order of Australia. He won a bronze medal at the 2000 Sydney Games in the Men's Discus Throw F38 event. That year, he received an Australian Sports Medal. He participated in the 2004 Athens Games, but did not win any medals at that competition.

References

External links
 Brian Harvey at Australian Athletics Historical Results
 

1965 births
Living people
Paralympic athletes of Australia
Athletes (track and field) at the 1996 Summer Paralympics
Athletes (track and field) at the 2000 Summer Paralympics
Athletes (track and field) at the 2004 Summer Paralympics
Medalists at the 1996 Summer Paralympics
Medalists at the 2000 Summer Paralympics
Paralympic gold medalists for Australia
Paralympic bronze medalists for Australia
Sportspeople from Rockhampton
Cerebral Palsy category Paralympic competitors
Track and field athletes with cerebral palsy
Recipients of the Medal of the Order of Australia
Recipients of the Australian Sports Medal
Australian male discus throwers
Australian male javelin throwers
Australian male shot putters
Paralympic medalists in athletics (track and field)